Mark Joseph James, (born February 10, 1985), who goes by the stage name Bumps Inf, is an American Christian hip hop musician from Cleveland, Ohio. He has released two studio albums, Pain in Paragraphs, in 2012, and Man vs. Machine, in 2015, both through God Over Money Records.

Early life
Bumps Inf was born on February 10, 1985, as Mark Joseph James, in Cleveland, Ohio. His mother is Tina Marie James.

Music career
His first studio album, Pain in Paragraphs, was released on August 28, 2012, with God Over Money Records. A second studio album, Man vs. Machine, was released on February 11, 2015, again with God Over Money Records. This was his debut album on the Billboard charts, and landed a placement on the Christian Albums chart at No. 43. New Release Tuesday rated the album four and a half stars out of five.

Personal life
Bumps Inf married his second wife, Rachel James (née, Lane) on August 25, 2012, and they are presently residing in Cleveland, Ohio. He was previously married to another woman for eight years. Bumps Inf has six children.

Discography

Studio albums

References

1985 births
Living people
Musicians from Cleveland
American performers of Christian hip hop music
Rappers from Cleveland
21st-century American rappers